The 38th Golden Horse Awards (Mandarin:第38屆金馬獎) took place on December 8, 2001 at Hualien Stadium in Hualien County, Taiwan.

References

38th
2001 film awards
2001 in Taiwan